Omar Ashour is a British-Canadian security and military studies academic and a former martial arts champion.

Academic career
Ashour is the author of How ISIS Fights: Military Tactics in Iraq, Syria, Libya and Egypt (Edinburgh: Edinburgh University Press, 2021) and The Deradicalization of Jihadists: Transforming Armed Islamist Movements, (London, New York: Routledge, 2009). Ashour has published about de-radicalization, counter-narratives, and transitions to democracy.

Martial Arts

Ashour is a Taekwondo master and a kickboxer. He was a member of the Egyptian National Taekwondo team. His record includes a bronze medal in the World Junior Taekwondo Championship and a silver medal in Africa’s Taekwondo championship. He was the Egyptian national champion six times in the bantam and feather weight categories. He was also the two-times national champion in Chinese Kickboxing (Sanshou). In 2007, he joined the Canadian National Karate Team and won the Gold medal in the All Japan Koshiki Karate-Do Federation Championship in the middle-weight category, defeating seven-times World Champion, Masamitsu Hisataka via unanimous decision.

References

Canadian political scientists
Academics of the University of Exeter
Living people
Year of birth missing (living people)